Thomas Hodges (born ) is an Australian male volleyball player. He is part of the Australia men's national volleyball team. On club level he plays for UC Irvine.

References

External links
 profile at FIVB.org

1994 births
Living people
Australian men's volleyball players
Place of birth missing (living people)